A 99-year lease was, under historic common law, the longest possible term of a lease of real property.  It is no longer the law in most common law jurisdictions today, yet 99-year leases continue to be common as a matter of business practice and conventional wisdom.

The law
Under the traditional common law doctrine, the 99-year term was not literal, but merely an arbitrary time span beyond the life expectancy of any possible lessee (user) or lessor (owner).

William Blackstone (1723–1780, of Commentaries on the Laws of England fame) states that a lease was formerly limited to 40 years, although much longer leases (for 300 years, or 1000 years) were in use by the time of Edward III. The 40-year limit was based on the unreliable text "The Mirror of Justices" (book 2, chapter 27).

In the law of several US states, a 99-year lease will always be the longest possible contract for realty by statute, but many states have enacted shorter terms and some allow infinite terms.

Due to the influence of the ideas of Henry George at the time the Australian Capital Territory (ACT) was established in the early 20th century, all land in the ACT is held under 99-year leases, the first of which will expire in 2023.

The 99-year lease concept has been more common under the civil law regimes when it comes to concessions of territory: most concessions last for 99 years.

Examples 
 Destroyers for Bases Agreement – leased old U.S. Navy destroyers to the United Kingdom in exchange for the right to construct U.S. Armed Forces bases in the British Empire, including Newfoundland, the British West Indies, and British Guiana.

Americas 
 Boston Museum of Science – leased by the Boston municipal government to the Metropolitan District Commission
 Castaway Cay – leased to Disney by the Bahamian government in 1996 
 Ontario Highway 407 Express Toll Route – leased to private company by the Ontario provincial government under Premier Mike Harris for C$3.1 billion.
 Panama Canal – Panama leased the canal and the surrounding zone to the United States during the 20th century. Returned to full Panamanian control by 1999 under the 1977 Torrijos-Carter treaties.

Asia 
 British Hong Kong – The Convention for the Extension of Hong Kong Territory resulted in the 99-year lease of the New Territories from the Qing Empire to the British Empire in 1898. Hong Kong Island and the Kowloon Peninsula had already been ceded to the British in perpetuity after the Opium Wars. Returned to full control of the People's Republic of China in the 1997 Hong Kong handover. 
 Magampura Mahinda Rajapaksa Port – Sri Lanka to China

See also 
 999-year lease
 Ground rent
 Lend-lease
 Rule against perpetuities

References

Real property law
Common law
Contract law